Kvisljungeby is a locality situated in Göteborg Municipality, Västra Götaland County, Sweden. It had 639 inhabitants in 2010.

References 

Populated places in Västra Götaland County
Populated places in Gothenburg Municipality